The 2022 World Junior Ice Hockey Championship Division II consisted of two tiered groups of six teams each: the fourth-tier Division II A and the fifth-tier Division II B. For each tier's tournament, the team which placed first was promoted to the next highest division, while the team which placed last was relegated to a lower division.

To be eligible as a junior player in these tournaments, a player cannot be born earlier than 2002.

Division II A

The Division II A tournament was played in Brașov, Romania, from 13 to 19 December 2021.

Participants

Final standings

Results
All times are local (UTC+2).

Statistics

Top 10 scorers

GP = Games played; G = Goals; A = Assists; Pts = Points; +/− = Plus-minus; PIM = Penalties In Minutes
Source: IIHF

Goaltending leaders
(minimum 40% team's total ice time)

TOI = Time on ice (minutes:seconds); GA = Goals against; GAA = Goals against average; Sv% = Save percentage; SO = Shutouts
Source: IIHF

Best Players Selected by the Directorate
 Goaltender:  Carlo Muraro
 Defenceman:  Park Jun-seo
 Forward:  Finley Howells

Source: IIHF

Division II B

The Division II B tournament would have been played in Belgrade, Serbia, from 10 to 15 January 2022. On 24 December 2021, the tournament was cancelled due to the COVID-19 pandemic and the rapid spread of the Omicron variant. It is replanned from 12-17 September.

Participants

Final standings

Results

Statistics

Top 10 Scorers 

GP = Games played; G = Goals; A = Assists; Pts = Points; +/− = Plus-minus; PIM = Penalties In Minutes
Source: IIHF

Goaltending leaders
(minimum 40% team's total ice time)

TOI = Time on ice (minutes:seconds); GA = Goals against; GAA = Goals against average; Sv% = Save percentage; SO = Shutouts
Source: IIHF

Best Players Selected by the Directorate
 Goaltender:  Akim Padalica
 Defenceman:  Wesley de Bruijn
 Forward:  Vito Idžan

References

External links
Division II A
Division II B

II
World Junior Ice Hockey Championships – Division II
International ice hockey competitions hosted by Romania
International ice hockey competitions hosted by Serbia
Sports competitions in Belgrade
IIHF
IIHF
Ice hockey events cancelled due to the COVID-19 pandemic